is a side-scrolling beat 'em up video game developed and published by Sega, first released on the Sega Mega Drive in December 1991. It is the home console sequel to the popular game Golden Axe, marking the second game in the series, though the arcade did see a sequel of its own in 1992, titled Golden Axe: The Revenge of Death Adder. Golden Axe II was only released on the Mega Drive, while the original was released on many other platforms. The game later appeared in Sonic's Ultimate Genesis Collection for Xbox 360 and PlayStation 3, as an iOS app on iTunes, and on the Nintendo Switch Online + Expansion Pack.

Plot
The three playable characters from the first Golden Axe — Ax Battler, Tyris Flare, and Gilius Thunderhead — return in Golden Axe II to save the people of the land from a new clan of evil warriors and their lord Dark Guld and reclaim from him the legendary Golden Axe. The game features a total of seven levels: six scrolling levels and a final end of game boss battle against Dark Guld.

Gameplay
Golden Axe II is a side-scrolling arcade-style (it was also actually released on arcade machines) hack 'n' slash game, very similar to the first Golden Axe. The player is given a choice of three fighters: an axe-handling dwarf named Gilius Thunderhead a barbarian named Ax Battler who wields a two-handed sword, and longsword-brandishing amazon named Tyris Flare. Each of the fighters has a unique elemental form of magic which can be used at any time in the game to inflict damage upon enemies. Each player is given a set of life bars which are lost one by one if the player is hit.

Though the characters and gameplay were virtually unchanged from the first game, there were a few improvements. The "back attack" (performed by pressing the Jump and Attack buttons simultaneously) for each character was changed to a more useful attack that hit enemies on all sides. Enemies could now be thrown in either direction by pressing right or left on the D-pad immediately after picking them up, making it easier to hit other enemies with them or throw them off cliffs. Most importantly, the magic system was overhauled. Whereas in the first game, pressing the magic button used all of a player's magic pots, one could now use part or all of one's magic by holding the button and releasing it when the meter had reached the desired level. The magic was also changed; Ax Battler's "exploding" magic from the first game was replaced with wind magic, and Gilius Thunderhead now used rock magic instead of lightning. Tyris Flare retained her fire magic, but was still given entirely new animations for it. Ax Battler now has longer reach with his weapon than Tyris (in the first Golden Axe, Ax Battler and Tyris had identical reach) and can throw enemies higher and farther. Finally, there were small cosmetic changes in the form of a shoulder guard for Ax Battler and black gauntlets for Gilius Thunderhead.

There are two types of game modes. One is "The Duel", where players are pitted against enemies in one arena, battling one after the other and gradually getting more difficult. The other is normal mode, where players must navigate through different areas battling various enemies.

Between each level a rating is awarded to the player(s) based on their performance, with a final rating awarded at the end of the game. A small exposition of the main story is also given.

Normal mode
Normal mode puts the player into the story of the game, where they must recover the golden axe from Dark Guld. The player must navigate through multiple areas until eventually they reach Dark Guld's castle. There are seven stages in total, including Ravaged Village, Ruins, Tower, Dragon's Throat Cave, Castle Gates, Castle, and Dark Guld's Chamber. Each area ends with a boss where the player must battle a large group of enemies at once. Magic books are also gathered along the way allowing the player to increase their magic meter. There are also three Bizarrians that can be mounted and used against enemy characters, including Chicken Legs, Green Dragons, and Fire Dragons.

Duel mode
The duel mode consists of multiple rounds where the player must defeat an enemy, or a group of enemies. Every round is set in the same scenery and the player must be victorious over 15 levels in order to complete the duel.

Release

The game was made available on the compilation for PlayStation 2 and PlayStation Portable known in the U.S. as Sega Genesis Collection and in Europe as Sega Mega Drive Collection, along with the first game and Golden Axe III and many other Genesis/Mega Drive titles. On June 11, 2007 the title was added to the Wii Virtual Console. It is also available on GameTap and iTunes. On June 1, 2010, Sega Mega Drive and Genesis Classics was released on Steam and the Golden Axe trilogy became available for PCs. On June 29, 2018, the collection Sega Genesis Classics was released for PlayStation 4, Xbox One and PC, with a Nintendo Switch version following in December that same year. On December 15, 2022, the game was re-released on the Nintendo Switch Online + Expansion Pack.

Reception

Console XS gave an overall score of 75/100 and felt that Golden Axe II is easier than its predecessor. Mega Action gave an overall score of 90% initially praising the game being bigger and better than the original but criticizing the game not having much to offer concluding: "If you want more of the same, then this is for you."

Allgame gave a review score of 3 out of five stars commenting that the game has almost exactly the same graphics, sound, and options and nothing really different that makes the sequel stand out, concluding, “The game is still enjoyable for what it is, however, and fans of the original probably won't mind that it's more of the same.” Illusionware praised the game having slightly improved graphics compared to its predecessor although commenting that the gameplay remains unchanged stating: "A nice little sequel with slightly better graphics but nothing really new on the gameplay side."  They concluded with a score of 7/10.

Mega placed the game at number 14 in their Top Mega Drive Games of All Time. In 2017, Gamesradar ranked the game 34th on their "Best Sega Genesis/Mega Drive games of all time."

Notes

References

External links

1991 video games
Cooperative video games
Fantasy video games
Golden Axe
Hack and slash games
Nintendo Switch Online games
PlayStation Network games
Sega beat 'em ups
Sega Genesis games
Side-scrolling beat 'em ups
Video game sequels
Video games developed in Japan
Video games featuring female protagonists
Video games set in castles
Virtual Console games
Xbox 360 Live Arcade games